Keivi Mayerlin Pinto (born December 26, 1979) is a female judoka from Venezuela, who won the bronze medal in the women's half heavyweight division (– 78 kg) at the 2003 Pan American Games in Santo Domingo, Dominican Republic.

Career
She represented her native country at the 2004 Summer Olympics in Athens, Greece. Pinto won the bronze medal of the under 78 kg division of the 2006 Central American and Caribbean Games.

References
  sports-reference

1979 births
Living people
Venezuelan female judoka
Judoka at the 2003 Pan American Games
Judoka at the 2004 Summer Olympics
Judoka at the 2011 Pan American Games
Olympic judoka of Venezuela
Pan American Games bronze medalists for Venezuela
Pan American Games medalists in judo
Central American and Caribbean Games bronze medalists for Venezuela
Competitors at the 2006 Central American and Caribbean Games
South American Games bronze medalists for Venezuela
South American Games medalists in judo
Competitors at the 2010 South American Games
Central American and Caribbean Games medalists in judo
Medalists at the 2003 Pan American Games
20th-century Venezuelan women
21st-century Venezuelan women